Iowa's first aeronautical event was the flight of a balloon around 1850 by Professor Silas Brooks. Iowa's first powered flight was made by Art J. Hartman in his Iowa built, Hartman monoplane on 10 May 1910.

Events 
On 13 October 1910 Thomas Scott Baldwin demonstrated the Baldwin Red Devil at the Iowa city fair.
September 5, 1912, Lincoln Beachey delivers the first Iowa airmail letters.
19 July 1989, United Airlines Flight 232 DC-10 makes a crash landing with complete hydraulic failure at Sioux Gateway Airport.

Aircraft Manufacturers 
Angel Aircraft Corporation, Orange City, Iowa Builds the AAC Angel pusher light twin.
Grinnell Aeroplane Company (1914-1918) Grinnell, Iowa - Manufactured early biplanes.
Central States Aero (1926-) was founded in Davenport, Iowa building an aircraft designed by Clayton Folkerts that would become the popular Monocoupe series.

Aerospace 
Adams-Farwell, Dubuque, Iowa- An early automobile manufacturer developed radial engines used in early aircraft.

Airports 
 Des Moines International Airport is the busiest airport in Iowa with 898,840 passenger movements in 2010.

 List of Airports in Iowa

Commercial Service

Organizations 
The Iowa Aviation Promotion Group is a non-profit organization with a mission to promote aviation within Iowa

Government and Military
All flight operations in Iowa are conducted within FAA oversight.
The Iowa State Patrol Air Wing was founded in 1956. It now operates 3 Cessna 182, 5 Cessna 172, and one Piper Saratoga.

Museums 
Iowa Aviation Museum, located in Greenfield, Iowa
Iowa Aviation Heritage Museum, Ankeny, Iowa

References 

 
Transportation in Iowa